Miguel de Fuenllana (c.1500–1579) was a Spanish vihuelist and composer of the Renaissance.

Biography
Little is known of his life. It is assumed from his name that his roots lie in the municipality of Fuenllana, in the province of Ciudad Real, although he was born in Navalcarnero, Madrid. Blind from birth, he composed a Libro de música para vihuela intitulado Orphenica Lyra  (Seville, 1554), dedicated to Philip II of Spain. At the arrival of Isabel de Valois, third wife of Philip II, she brought with her a group of French instrumental musicians who wished to stay in the Spanish court; Fuenllana alternated with this group and his musical works were performed together with those of foreign artists. At the death of the queen in 1568, he continued serving in the Spanish court.  He later served Don Sebastian of Portugal in Lisbon starting in 1574.

Works
Orphénica Lyra comprises 182 pieces in six volumes. In the first three, the pieces are ordered ascending by the number of voices, passing through 2 and 3 in the first to 5 and 6 in the motets of the third volume. The book includes 51 fantasias newly composed by Fuenllanas alongside works of 17 other composers. His style is polyphonic with a texture similar to that of Cristobal de Morales. This work also contains arrangements of vocal pieces by Josquin, Morales, Francisco Guerrero, and Philippe Verdelot, musicians from both Spain and the Low Countries. Fuenllana preferred the voice accompanied by vihuela to the vihuela solo. The vocal parts are written in red ciphers, indicating which notes are to be sung while the black ones are to be played on the vihuela; alternatively, one can play the whole intabulation although it is often very demanding (e.g., Mateo Flecha's Ensalada 'La Bomba' in the Libro Sexto).

The merits of Fuenllana's work were known to his contemporaries; in the Declaración de instrumentos of Fray Juan Bermudo, he writes:

Fuenllana was adept at finding apt harmonies and counterpoint to popular melodies: some of these traditional pieces are De los alamos vengo, madre, used by Lope de Vega; Morenica, dame, Con que la lavare, De Antequera sale el moro, and the romance of the loss of Antequera; thus, he presaged the coming of the accompanied melody of the Italians at the beginning of the seventeenth century.

Further reading
 Neuman, Hans Federico, Introducción a la música española del Renacimiento
 Griffiths, John Anthony. “The ‘vihuela’ Fantasia: A Comparative Study of Forms and Styles” (Ph.D., Monash University, Australia, 1984).
 Ward, John Milton. "The Vihuela de Mano and its Music (1536-1576)" (Ph.D., New York University, New York, 1953).

External links
Libro de Mvsica para Vihuela, intitulado Orphenica lyra : enl ql se cotienen muchas y diuersas obras... / copuesto por Miguel de Fuenllana (Biblioteca Virtual de Andalucía)
 

Renaissance composers
Blind classical musicians
Spanish blind people
Spanish classical composers
Male classical composers
Spanish male classical composers
1500s births
1579 deaths
Vihuela players